Kira Henehan is an American author and novelist. Her 2010 novel Orion You Came and You Took All My Marbles was nominated for the Believer Book Award.

Biography
Henehan was born in New York. She grew up in the United States, the Caribbean, and Canada. She attended Columbia University and San Francisco State University. She currently lives in New York City.

Henehan's work has been compared to Samuel Beckett and George Saunders. She has been published in literary magazines such as Fence, Conjunctions, and Denver Quarterly. She has won a Pushcart Prize.

Bibliography
Orion You Came and You Took All My Marbles (2010)

References

Living people
21st-century American novelists
American women novelists
Columbia University alumni
San Francisco State University alumni
21st-century American women writers
21st-century American short story writers
Year of birth missing (living people)